The 2nd Rifle Division (or 2e Division d'Infanterie Polonaise) was a Polish Army unit, part of the recreated Polish Army in France in 1940.

The division (numbering 15,830 soldiers) was commanded by Brigadier-General Bronisław Prugar-Ketling, and was based from late December 1939 to May 1940 at Parthenay in Eastern France. Under Prugar-Ketling the division was charged with holding the defences around Belfort, Alsace. Assigned to part of the French reserves, 45th Corps. Engaged in heavy fighting from June 17 to 19 near the Doubs and Saône rivers, it stopped a German attack on the Clos-du-Doubs hills. but due to the (unknown to the Poles) rapid retreat of the nearby French forces it was surrounded by the Germans; nonetheless it managed to break through to Switzerland over 20–21 June 1940, where its soldiers were interned for the rest of the war, although many "escaped" back into France and eventually made their way to England to rejoin the Polish forces there. In Henri Guisan's defense plan for a German invasion of Switzerland, the 2nd Rifle Division would be rearmed and fight alongside the Swiss forces.

Organization 
Structure of the division:

 Chief of Staff, 2nd Polish Infantry Division
 4th Polish Infantry Regiment
 5th Polish Infantry Regiment
 6th Polish Infantry Regiment
 2nd Polish Artillery Regiment
 202nd Polish Heavy Artillery Regiment

Notes

External links
Order of battle

02nd Rifle
2nd Chasseurs
Military units and formations established in 1939
2nd Rifle
Military units and formations disestablished in 1940